Canadian Journal of Administrative Sciences (French: Revue Canadienne des Sciences de l'Administration) is a quarterly peer-reviewed academic journal published by Wiley-Blackwell on behalf of the Administrative Sciences Association of Canada. , the editor-in-chief is Michel Laroche (Concordia University). The journal publishes articles in both English and French in all key disciplines of business. According to the Journal Citation Reports, its 2015 impact factor is 0.405, ranking it 109 out of 120 journals in the category "Business" and 179 out of 192 journals in the category "Management".

Past editors 
The following persons have been or currently are editors of the journal:

References

External links 
 
 Official website of the Administrative Sciences Association of Canada
 Canadian Journal of Administrative Sciences at McMaster University

Wiley-Blackwell academic journals
Multilingual journals
Publications established in 1983
Quarterly journals
Business and management journals
Academic journals associated with learned and professional societies of Canada